The 2009 Lithuanian Athletics Championships were held in S. Darius and S. Girėnas Stadium, Kaunas on August 1–2, 2009. The Championships was also qualifications for 2009 World Championships in Athletics.

Men

Women

Medals by city

See also
 Lithuania at the 2009 World Championships in Athletics

External links
 Lithuanian athletics

Lithuanian Athletics Championships
Lithuanian Athletics Championships, 2009
Lithuanian Athletics Championships